In Greek mythology, Phaeno (Ancient Greek: Φαινώ Phainô means 'appear, reveal, shine') was one of the 3,000 Oceanids, water-nymph daughters of the Titans Oceanus and his sister-spouse Tethys.

Mythology 
Along with her sisters, Phaeno was one of the companions of Persephone when the daughter of Demeter was abducted by Hades.

Notes

References 

 The Homeric Hymns and Homerica with an English Translation by Hugh G. Evelyn-White. Homeric Hymns. Cambridge, MA.,Harvard University Press; London, William Heinemann Ltd. 1914. Online version at the Perseus Digital Library. Greek text available from the same website.
 Pausanias, Description of Greece with an English Translation by W.H.S. Jones, Litt.D., and H.A. Ormerod, M.A., in 4 Volumes. Cambridge, MA, Harvard University Press; London, William Heinemann Ltd. 1918. . Online version at the Perseus Digital Library
 Pausanias, Graeciae Descriptio. 3 vols. Leipzig, Teubner. 1903.  Greek text available at the Perseus Digital Library.

Oceanids